N036 Belka (literally Squirrel) is an active electronically scanned array radar system developed by Tikhomirov NIIP for the fifth generation Sukhoi Su-57 fighter aircraft.

Design
The radar is a part of Sh121 multifunctional integrated radio electronic system (MIRES) onboard the Su-57. The N036 radar system is developed by Tikhomirov NIIP Institute and consists of a main nose-mounted X-band AESA radar with 1,514 T/R modules, designated the N036-1-01, and two smaller X-band AESA radars with 404 T/R modules mounted on the sides of the forward fuselage designated N036B-1-01. The suite also has two N036L-1-01 L-band arrays on the wing's leading edge extensions that are not only used for friend-or-foe identification but also for electronic warfare purposes. Computer processing of the X- and L-band signals enable the systems information to be significantly enhanced. It has the ability to track 60 targets and shoot 16 targets in the air simultaneously, or engage up to four targets on land at the same time. The L402 "Himalayas" electronic countermeasures (ECM) suite made by the KNIRTI institute uses both its own arrays and that of the N036 radar.

In 2012, ground tests of the N036 radar began on the third (T-50-3) and fifth (T-50-5) Su-57 prototype aircraft. Tikhomirov-NIIP has delivered six forward-looking prototype N036 Byelka radar for Su-57 fighter jets.

References

Bibliography

 Butowski, Piotr. "Raptorski's Maiden Flight". Air International,  Vol. 78, No 3, March 2010, pp. 30–37. Stamford, UK: Key Publishing.
 Butowski, Piotr. "Su-57 Felon". Combat Aircraft, Vol. 78, No 3, March 2010, pp. 30–37. Stamford, UK: Key Publishing.
 Butowski, Piotr. "T-50 Turning and Burning over Moscow". Air International,  Vol. 85, No 4, October 2013, pp. 79–82. Stamford, UK: Key Publishing.

Aircraft radars
Russian and Soviet military radars
Tikhomirov Scientific Research Institute of Instrument Design products